Optimistic Tragedy is a play written by Vsevolod Vishnevskiy in the Soviet Union in 1933 with a dedication to the 15th anniversary of the Red Army.

The play is set in St. Petersburg, and Kronstadt, Russia, after the Russian Revolution and during the Russian Civil War. Some scenes are set on a ship of the Red Navy on the Baltic Sea near Saint Petersburg. The play has three acts.

Adaptations

The play was adapted into the film Optimistic Tragedy by Samson Samsonov. 

In 1965, Alexander Kholminov adapted it into an opera.

References
 Russian original text: Оптимистическая трагедия

1933 plays
Plays adapted into operas
Russian plays adapted into films